Chocolate pipefish, Syngnathus euchrous, is a species of the pipefishes. Widespread in the Eastern Pacific from Redondo Beach in southern California, United States, to central Baja California, Mexico. Marine subtropical demersal fish, up to 25 cm length.

References

chocolate pipefish
Fish of the Western United States
Fish of Mexican Pacific coast
Western North American coastal fauna
chocolate pipefish